Henry B. Friedman Tobacco Warehouse is a historic tobacco warehouse located at Lancaster, Lancaster County, Pennsylvania. It was built about 1880, and is a 2 1/2-story, rectangular brick building with a raised basement and stucco-covered stone foundation. It has a moderately pitched gable roof. It is three bays wide and six bays deep.

It was listed on the National Register of Historic Places in 1990.

References

Industrial buildings and structures on the National Register of Historic Places in Pennsylvania
Industrial buildings completed in 1880
Buildings and structures in Lancaster, Pennsylvania
National Register of Historic Places in Lancaster, Pennsylvania
1880 establishments in Pennsylvania